In quantum field theory, and especially asymptotically free quantum field theories, an observable is infrared safe if it does not depend on the low energy/long distance physics of the theory. Such observables can therefore be calculated reliably using perturbative methods and then compared to experiment.
An example of an observable which is infrared safe is the total scattering cross-section for the collision of an electron and a positron to produce hadrons.

See also
 Asymptotic freedom
 Infrared divergence
 Kinoshita–Lee–Nauenberg theorem

References

Quantum field theory
Quantum chromodynamics